Knockanare Well is a holy well in County Cork, Ireland.

It is situated on the left bank of the River Awbeg, about a half-mile east of Buttevant and southeast of the Ballyhoura Mountains.  A Sheela na Gig once stood next to the well.  The water from this well remains crystal-clear and sweet.

Folklore attributes various special powers to this well, such as that its water will not boil or that two trout appear in it at certain times of the year.

A story regarding this well states that one day, one of Fionn Mac Cumhail's men strayed from his company and sought the hospitality of a local chieftain.  He fell in love with the chieftain's daughter and they eloped.  The chieftain's men caught up with them and the man was mortally wounded.  At the advice of locals, he bathed in the Knockanare Well and was cured. 

Another story states that during the wars of rebellion, Irish wounded in battle were taken to the well and cured instantly.  An English general scoffed at these miracles until his own son was wounded in battle and subsequently cured by the well.  In celebration, the general supposedly built golden gates near the well that were later dismantled and hidden nearby.

References

Irish mythology
Religion in County Cork
Holy wells in Ireland